Mohd Amerul Affendi bin Mohd Mawardi (born 7 October 1986) is a Malaysian actor. He is best known for his acting roles in television and film. For his role as Toyu in the film Terbaik dari Langit (2014), he won the Best Supporting Actor award at the 27th Malaysian Film Festival in 2015.

Other activities
Outside of his acting career, Amerul Affendi is also involved in the agricultural industry which has been in business since 2016 to secure his future. According to him: "For the past three years I have been active in agriculture such as palm oil cultivation and livestock including buffalo and catfish. I am working on this project in my hometown of Temerloh, Pahang. If in the past the acting world was a major source of income, now it is no longer because my focus is on agriculture".

Filmography

Film

Television series

Telemovie

Theatre

Videography

Music video

Short video

Awards and nominations

References

External links
 
 
 
 

1986 births
Living people
Malaysian Muslims
Malaysian people of Malay descent
Malaysian male actors
21st-century Malaysian male actors
Malaysian television actors
Malaysian film actors
Malaysian stage actors
People from Pahang